Joël Drommel (born 16 November 1996) is a Dutch professional footballer who plays as a goalkeeper for Eredivisie side PSV.

Club career
Drommel used to play as a midfielder, but turned goalkeeper before joining the Almere City youth set-up. He then had a season with IJsselmeervogels, before joining FC Twente in 2014. He made his Eredivisie debut on 12 September 2015 against AFC Ajax in a 2–2 draw.

In the 2019–20 and 2020–21 seasons, he appeared in all but one KNVB Cup match. In March 2021, Twente triggered a one-year option in contract. Shortly afterwards, Drommel was sold to PSV for €3.5 million, signing a five-year contract effective from the 2021–22 season.

International career
Drommel was called up to the senior Netherlands squad in November 2020.

Personal life
His father Piet-Jan Drommel played for AZ and SC Telstar.

Career statistics

Honours
PSV Eindhoven
 KNVB Cup: 2021–22
Johan Cruyff Shield: 2021, 2022

References

External links
Profile at the PSV Eindhoven website
Netherlands profile at Ons Oranje

1996 births
Living people
People from Bussum
Association football goalkeepers
Dutch footballers
Netherlands under-21 international footballers
Netherlands youth international footballers
FC Twente players
PSV Eindhoven players
Eredivisie players
Eerste Divisie players
Footballers from North Holland
Jong FC Twente players
IJsselmeervogels players